The Roman Catholic Diocese of San is a diocese located in the city of San in the Ecclesiastical province of Bamako in Mali.

History
 April 10, 1962: Established as Mission “sui iuris” of San from Diocese of Nouna in Burkina Faso
 September 29, 1964: Promoted as Diocese of San

Bishops
 Ecclesiastical Superior of San (Roman rite) 
 Father Joseph Paul Barnabé Perrot, M. Afr. (1962.04.10 – 1964.09.29 see below)
 Bishops of San (Roman rite)
 Bishop Joseph Paul Barnabé Perrot, M. Afr. (see above 1964.09.29 – 1987.11.18)
 Bishop Jean-Gabriel Diarra (1987.11.18 – 2019.10.28)
 Bishop Hassa Florent Koné (2021.10.07 – ...)

Other priest of this diocese who became bishop
Jonas Dembélé, appointed Bishop of Kayes in 2013

See also
Roman Catholicism in Mali

References

External links
 GCatholic.org

San, Mali
San
Christian organizations established in 1962
Roman Catholic dioceses and prelatures established in the 20th century
1962 establishments in Mali
Roman Catholic Ecclesiastical Province of Bamako